The Hanumante River is a tributary of the Bagmati River which is almost entirely in the district of Bhaktapur, Nepal. It originates from Mahadev Pokhari, Nagarkot, the river flows through Bhaktapur and Thimi Municipality before joining Manohara River, Kathmandu District. The Hanumante River has an average width of a minimum of 10m to a maximum of 20m.

In July 2020, the river flooded the district of Bhaktapur due to heavy rainfall.

References

Citations 

 

H